Dainty was an English race-built galleon that began to be built in 1588. The original name was Repentance, but this was soon changed. She participated in some naval engagements in the Anglo-Spanish War (1585–1604). In 1593 she sailed from England under Richard Hawkins to navigate the Pacific Ocean and circumnavigate the world, but was captured the following year by the Spaniards when she was sailing off the coast of what is now Ecuador. She was commissioned by the Spaniards as Nuestra Señora de la Visitación (or Visitación), serving in the South Pacific for several years.

Construction
In 1588, the privateer Richard Hawkins, son of John Hawkins and cousin of Francis Drake, began building a ship on the River Thames to become independent of his father and sail towards the Pacific Ocean, emulating Drake and Thomas Cavendish.

On the day of its launch, the ship was named Repentance by Hawkins's puritanical stepmother. Renamed Dainty in 1589 by order of Queen Elizabeth I of England, since when she saw the ship, she considered it beautiful.

Career

English service

Hawkins could not make the trip he dreamed when the ship was ready, as he was forced to sell it to his father, remaining in the service of the Queen's Navy since 1589, during the Anglo-Spanish War. In that year, his father added Dainty in the fleet under Martin Frobisher. In 1592, he participated in the Cruising Voyage to the Azores Islands, collaborating in the capture of the Portuguese carrack  with a rich cargo and also of a 600-ton Biscayan ship loaded with iron. On that occasion her captain was not Hawkins, she was captained by another, who varies according to the sources, Thomas Thompson or John Norton.

In the brief career of the ship she had already demonstrated good attributes, but Hawkins' father considered that she "never brought but cost, trouble and care", so, as a businessman, he decided to sell it to his son. The young Hawkins resumed his old project for which he had built the Dainty, preparing it in a short time; with a 100 men and 20 or 32 guns.

On 12 June 1593, after Hawkins obtained a letter of queen's mark, he sailed from Plymouth to South America with the flagship Dainty and two other ships that formed his squadron; the 100-ton storeship Hawk and the 60-ton pinnace Fancy. Historians say that the crew of the Dainty and the other ships were of very poor quality, which would explain the delay they had in passing the English Channel and the three months in the Canary Islands. Before passing the Equator, the ship was almost wrecked in the Gulf of Guinea due to Hawkins errors in calculation, and as time passed, the crew began to be affected by diseases such as scurvy. On November 10, Hawkins approached Santos (Brazil) with his squadron to provision and five days later he anchored off Santa Ana Island to establish a camp, being harassed by Native Portuguese militiamen, while stalking ships on the coast. Due to the number of deaths from disease, the Hawk was sunk by Hawkins and its crew redistributed between the Dainty and Fancy. In December, he abandoned his anchorage off Brazil and, during cruising, captured a 100-ton Portuguese ship with the newly appointed governor and 50 soldiers for Angola, which was deprived of all his provisions before being released in January 1594. In the same month, while sailing near the Río de la Plata, the Dainty lost contact with the Fancy, which after separating reversed its course to England. Hawkins arrived with the Dainty in the Falkland Islands, and believing that he had discovered the islands, he baptized them again.

On February 20, Hawkins arrived with his ship at the Strait of Magellan, emerging in the Pacific in early April, heading to the coast of Chile. In the same month, after overcoming a storm, he passed through Valdivia and Mocha Island. Later, the Dainty appeared in Valparaíso, where he captured several ships for which Hawkins got a ransom in money, continuing his journey to the north coast. On 31 May, sailing along the Peruvian coast, between Chincha Alta and San Vicente de Cañete, he met a Spanish squadron of six ships of varied tonnage under Beltrán de Castro, who had already been alerted to Hawkins's presence. The Dainty managed to escape due to the strong winds that damaged Spanish vessels. Hawkins continued with the ship to the north and, at the end of June, near the bay of Atacames (Ecuador), sighted the Spaniards with two ships under Castro. The Dainty was captured by the Spaniards in a fight that took place on 2 July, becoming the first vessel captured by the Spaniards in the South Pacific.

Spanish service

The Spaniards sailed the Dainty to the Pearl Islands and then to the port of Perico (west-northwest of Panama City), having a jubilant reception on 9 July. The guns and ammunition of the prize were priced at 78,000 pesos. The ship was paraded through the harbour like a war trophy, receiving the townspeople on board. For two months the ship was repaired there, and was then taken to Callao, in the Viceroyalty of Peru. She entered the service of the Spanish Navy with the name of Nuestra Señora de la Visitación (also called Visitación), in consideration of the religious holiday of the day she was captured. In addition to the new name, it was nicknamed La Inglesa. The ship remained in service in the Armada del Mar del Sur (English: South Sea Navy) until twenty-five years after its capture by the Spaniards.

During Viceroy Luis de Velasco's rule (1596–1604), remained permanently enlisted since Dutch intruders entered the South Pacific between 1599 and 1600. In January 1600, he was sent with other ships to find the Dutch. By then, the ship was carried a crew of 145 and was armed with 18 guns. In this period, the Visitación would have been the second capital ship of the Pacific squadron. Between 1602 and 1604, the Visitación underwent an important reconstruction in the shipyard of Guayaquil, which has led some historians to consider it as a completely new vessel.

By 1615, Visitación was in poor condition, she already had several years of service. In the middle of that year, she stayed in Callao to protect the port, with 30 men and 12 guns, from the threat of the Dutch squadron under Joris van Spilbergen. Shortly after, she set sail for Panama in a convoy, carrying money from the Royal Treasury and private sector, and to bring the new Viceroy of Peru, the Prince of Esquilache. In the government of Esquilache, the veteran Visitación was still in service despite her shortcomings when sailing close-hauled. Later, with the realization of the naval plans of Esquilache between 1617 and 1619, it was sold to finance the purchase of other warships.

See also
 List of early warships of the English navy
 List of galleons of Spain

Notes

References

Bibliography
 
 
 
 
 
 

16th-century ships
Ships of the English navy
Exploration ships of England
Age of Sail ships of Spain
Galleons
Age of Discovery ships
Individual sailing vessels
Privateer ships
Captured ships